América Futebol Clube (also known as América Mineiro, Coelho or simply América) is a Brazilian football team from the city of Belo Horizonte, capital city of the Brazilian state of Minas Gerais. Founded in 1912, the club preserves its name and crest since its inception. The original home kit colours are white and green only; the black color was incorporated in the 1970s.
The team also played with a red home kit between 1933 and 1942, as a protest to the introduction of professionalism.
It hosts its matches at Independência stadium, being the only professional club in Belo Horizonte to have its own stadium.
The club has the third largest fan base among the teams from Minas Gerais.

América is one of the most traditional and successful teams from Minas Gerais. It has won the state championship 16 times, and finished as runners-up in another 16 occasions.
The first 10 victories were in a row, between 1916 and 1925, being the national record of successive accomplishments (together with ABC); the most recent was in 2016.
Other major accomplishments were the Brazilian Second Division in 1997 and 2017, South-Minas Cup in 2000, and  Brazilian Third Division in 2009.

The club has a long reputation in forming young talents in football.
Among others, it has revealed the world-class players Tostão, Éder Aleixo, Yuji Nakazawa, Gilberto Silva, Fred, Danilo and Richarlison. 
América has won the three most important junior tournaments in Brazil: São Paulo Juniors Cup (1996), Brazilian Championship U-20 (2011) and Belo Horizonte Juniors Cup (2000 and 2014).

History
On 30 April 1912, a group of young men who played football purely for the love of the game decided to turn their team into a football club. In the first meeting, the founders decided that the name of the club would be América Foot-Ball Club, and the colors would be green and white. The first matches were played on the mayor's field. In 1913, América and Minas Gerais Futebol Clube fused, and the club changed its colors to green, white and black. Between 1916 and 1925, the team won ten state championships in a row.

In 1933, as a protest to the professionalization of Brazilian football, the club changed its colors to red and white. In 1943, the club professionalized its football division, and returned to its previous colors. In 1948, América won its first state championship as a professional club.

In 1997, América won the Série B for the first time, and in 2000, the club won the Copa Sul-Minas first edition, beating Cruzeiro in the final. In 2004, after a poor performance in the Série B, América was relegated to the Campeonato Brasileiro Série C, and in 2007, the club finished in Campeonato Mineiro's last position, and was relegated to the following year's Campeonato Mineiro Módulo II. América won the Série C in 2009, beating ASA in the final. The following year, the team was fourth at Série B and returned to the top level of the Brazilian championship after ten years. On 14 June 2013, América signed a cooperation contract with the Tahitian Football Federation to develop under-20 national players.

Symbols
The club's official anthem was composed by Vicente Motta. There are also two other anthems: The unofficial anthem, which was composed by Fernando Brant and Tavinho Moura, and the supporters' anthem, whose lyrics were composed by Márcio Vianna Dias and sung by Fernando Ângelo. América's mascot, was created by the cartoonist Fernando Pierucetti, and is a red-eyed white cartoon rabbit with clearly protruding teeth.

Derbies
América's greatest rivals are Cruzeiro and Atlético Mineiro. The derby between América and Atlético Mineiro is known as O Clássico das Multidões (The Derby of the Masses), and was first played on November 15, 1913, in a friendly game that ended in a 1–1 draw.

Honours

Professional competitions
 Série B
 Winners (2): 1997, 2017
 Runners-up (1): 2020

 Série C
 Winner (1): 2009

 Copa Sul-Minas
 Winner (1): 2000

 Campeonato Mineiro
 Winners (16): 1916, 1917, 1918, 1919, 1920, 1921, 1922, 1923, 1924, 1925, 1948, 1957, 1971, 1993, 2001, 2016
 Runners-up (16): 1915, 1930, 1931, 1942, 1949, 1958, 1959, 1961, 1964, 1965, 1973, 1992, 1995, 1999, 2012, 2021

 Taça Minas Gerais
 Winner (1): 2005
 Runners-up (3): 1977, 1980, 1984

 Campeonato Mineiro Second Level
 Winner (1): 2008

Youth competitions
 Campeonato Brasileiro Sub-20
 Winner (1): 2011

 Copa São Paulo de Juniores
 Winner (1): 1996

 Taça Belo Horizonte de Juniores
 Winners (2): 2000, 2014
 Runner-up (1): 1995

Current squad

Reserve team

Out on loan

First-team staff

Notable players

 Álvaro Santos
 Claudinei
 Danilo
 Éder Aleixo
 Esio Vieira
 Euller
 Fred
 Gilberto
 Gilberto Silva
 Richarlison
 Juca Show
 Milagres
 Palhinha
 Satyro Tabuada
 Spencer Coelho
 Toninho Cerezo
 Tostão
 William Morais

Notable managers
 Carlos Alberto Silva
 Flávio Lopes
 Givanildo Oliveira
 Paulo Comelli
 Yustrich
 Lisca Doido

References

External links

 Official website

 
Association football clubs established in 1912
Football clubs in Belo Horizonte
1912 establishments in Brazil